Eric Lucke (3 February 1911 – 9 April 1990) was a South African sports shooter. He competed in the trap event at the 1960 Summer Olympics.

References

1911 births
1990 deaths
South African male sport shooters
Olympic shooters of South Africa
Shooters at the 1960 Summer Olympics
Sportspeople from Kimberley, Northern Cape
20th-century South African people